Yahya Kabi (born 1 July 1987) is a Saudi Arabian football player who currently plays as a left-back for Ohod.

Honours

Club
Al-Hilal
Saudi Professional League (1): 2010-11

References

External links
 
 2011-12 Profile at slstat.com
 2012-13 Profile at slstat.com
 Profile at soocerpunter.com
 

1987 births
Living people
Saudi Arabian footballers
Al-Watani Club players
Al Hilal SFC players
Al-Fateh SC players
Al-Shoulla FC players
Al-Wehda Club (Mecca) players
Al-Ansar FC (Medina) players
Al-Ain FC (Saudi Arabia) players
Al-Jabalain FC players
Ohod Club players
Saudi First Division League players
Saudi Professional League players
Association football defenders